André Gardère (8 May 1913 – 16 February 1977) was a French foil and sabre fencer. He won a silver medal in the team foil event at the 1936 Summer Olympics.

References

External links
 

1913 births
1977 deaths
French male foil fencers
Olympic fencers of France
Fencers at the 1936 Summer Olympics
Olympic silver medalists for France
Olympic medalists in fencing
Sportspeople from Vosges (department)
Medalists at the 1936 Summer Olympics
French male sabre fencers
20th-century French people